El Oued is a Saharan province of Algeria (n° 39) dominated by Oued Souf. It was named after its eponymous capital. Notable towns include El Oued itself and El M'Ghair, Djamaa and Guemar.

Geography

Physical geography

El Oued Province lies in the Sahara desert in northeast Algeria. The mostly uninhabited southern half of the province is covered by the Grand Erg Oriental, a vast region of uninterrupted sand dunes. The northern half of the province is a mixture of sandy desert with scarce vegetation, scattered oases, and salt lakes. The most notable oases are the Oued Souf region, upon which the capital El Oued and neighbouring towns are built, as well as oases located near the towns of El M'Ghair and Djamaa, both of which support extensive palm plantations. Chott Melrhir, a large endorheic salt lake, lies in the north-central part of the province, while Chott Felrhir is a smaller salt lake to its southwest, near El M'Ghair.

Climate

El Oued Province experiences a hot desert climate. Precipitation is very low throughout the province, but somewhat more rain does fall in the north, particularly during the winter and adjacent months.

Neighbouring districts

El Oued Province is bordered to the northeast by Tébessa Province, to the north by Khenchela Province, to the northwest by Biskra Province, to the south and southwest by Ouargla Province, to the southeast by Tunisia's Tataouine Governorate, and to the east by Tunisia's Tozeur and Kebili Governorates.

History
The province was created from Biskra Province in 1984.

Administrative divisions
The province is made up of 10 districts, which are divided into 22 communes or municipalities.

Districts

 Bayadha
 Debila
 El Oued
 Guemar
 Hassi Khelifa
 Magrane
 Mih Ouensa
 Reguiba
 Robbah
 Taleb Larbi

Communes

 Bayadha
 Ben Guecha
 Debila
 Douar El Ma
 El Ogla
 El Oued
 Guemar
 Hamraia
 Hassani Abdelkrim
 Hassi Khelifa
 Kouinine
 Magrane
 Mih Ouensa
 Nakhla
 Oued El Alenda
 Ourmes
 Reguiba
 Robbah
 Sidi Aoun
 Taghzout
 Taleb Larbi
 Trifaoui

References

 
Provinces of Algeria
States and territories established in 1984